The canton of Chevagnes is a former administrative division in central France. It was disbanded following the French canton reorganisation which came into effect in March 2015. It consisted of 10 communes, which joined the canton of Dompierre-sur-Besbre in 2015. It had 7,121 inhabitants (2012).

The canton comprised the following communes:

Beaulon
La Chapelle-aux-Chasses
Chevagnes
Chézy
Gannay-sur-Loire
Garnat-sur-Engièvre
Lusigny
Paray-le-Frésil
Saint-Martin-des-Lais
Thiel-sur-Acolin

Demographics

See also
Cantons of the Allier department

References

Former cantons of Allier
2015 disestablishments in France
States and territories disestablished in 2015